Lanestosa is a town and municipality located in the province of Biscay, in the autonomous community of Basque Country, northern Spain. It is a little municipality in the very west of Basque Country.

References

External links
 LANESTOSA in the Bernardo Estornés Lasa - Auñamendi Encyclopedia (Euskomedia Fundazioa) 

Municipalities in Biscay